Olfactory lobe may refer to:
 Olfactory bulb in vertebrates
 Antennal lobe in insects